Yannick Flohé (born 14 August 1999) is a German sport climber. He participated at the 2019 and 2021 IFSC Climbing World Championships, being awarded the bronze and gold medal in the men's bouldering and men's combined events.

References

External links 

Yannick Flohé at 8a.nu

1999 births
Living people
Place of birth missing (living people)
German rock climbers
IFSC Climbing World Championships medalists
21st-century German people
Boulder climbers